FC Odishi 1919 is a Georgian association football club based in Zugdidi, the administrative centre of Samegrelo-Zemo Svaneti. Being a municipal club, they currently take part in Liga 4, the forth tier of Georgian league system.

History

On 20 May 1919 two students of Zugdidi gymnasium Leo Chedia and Pier Kobakhidze organized a first football match in the city with Mertskhali (Swallows) represented as a local team. This date is considered a birthday for football in Zugdidi.  

The main football club of the city has had various names, especially after 1990, and as Dinamo Zugdidi, Odishi, Zugdidi, Baia, and Mglebi has taken part in Umaglesi Liga in different seasons.

Lazika Zugdidi, the predecessor of Odishi 1919, competed in lower divisions in early 2010s. Despite being the third division leaders for most of the 2012/13 season, only at the end they lost a promotion chance. A year later, though, the team remained unstoppable until a place in Pirveli Liga was booked. 

The debutants of the second division performed remarkably well to join the battle for a promotion spot. The club slipped up at the very end again, losing three games in a row in the last five matches, which allowed Locomotive Tbilisi to claim a second place paving the way for play-offs. Still, the third place in 2014-15 in Liga 2 has been the best result shown by Lazika. 

With another promotion attempt set as their goal, the club started the next season. But its first phase turned out so awful that the manager and some key players were axed. Ukrainian manager Sergey Zhitski as well as forward Levan Kutalia were invited. In the same season Lazika was introduced as Odishi 1919. As the manager pointed out, while taking this decision a special emphasis was given to the history of football in Zugdidi.        

Soon a sharp decline followed, which resulted in two successive relegations. It took the club one year to win promotion from Regionuli Liga.
Since then Odishi 1919 have been competing in Liga 4, formed in 2019.

Seasons

Manager
Head coach Besik Sherozia, who previously worked in Umaglesi Liga clubs Kolkheti-1913, Shukura and Zugdidi, has been in charge of Odishi 1919 since early 2020.

Current squad 
As of April 2022

Stadium

The club currently hosts home games at Central stadium located in Ganmukhuri, which is shared with FC Dinamo Zugdidi. The ground's capacity is 2,000.

Name
As an old name for Samegrelo, the term Odishi was widely applied in medieval times.

External links
Official website

Page on Facebook
   
On Soccerway

References

Association football clubs established in 1919
Odishi